Donald Najtellari (born 1 May), known professionally as Young Zerka, is an Albanian singer and songwriter. Born in Korçë and raised in London, Najtellari grew up in a Jamaican household and began singing and writing music as a teenager. He later relocated to Albania and eventually rose to significant prominence in the Albanian-speaking Balkans. His musical career is marked by fusing elements of reggae and pop as well as his distinctive vocal and writing style.

Life and career 

Najtellari was born on 1 May into an Albanian family in the city of Korçë, Albania. At an early age, Najtellari emigrated to England settling in the city of London. He was raised in a Jamaican household, which according to him, had a particular influence on his artistic formation. In both 2008 and 2009, Najtellari appeared on the music competition Top Fest with the songs "Sfera" and "Shpirt i plakur", respectively. In 2014, he was featured on Kosovo-Albanian singer Dhurata Dora's "Roll" and "A Bombi", as well as on Albanian singer Alban Skënderaj's "24 orë". In December 2014, he collaborated with Albanian singer Aurela Gaçe on the single "Pa kontroll", with whom they eventually won the 16th edition of the annual music competition Kënga Magjike. His success continued in May 2015 with the release of the follow-up single "Boom Boom", which reached number 11 in Albania.

Following the 2022 release of his original song, "Nafije", produced by popular artist and producer Alandy, on January 12, 2023, a remix was introduced to the public. The collaboration between Young Zerka, DJ Geek, Dafina Zeqiri, and MC Kresha peaked charts in Albania at #2 on Top Music Awards. Young Zerka, along with Alandy, appeared on Albania's top performing television show hosted by Luana Vjollca, Zemër Luana, for a debut television performance of the original "Nafije".

Artistry 

Najtellari's musical style has generally been regarded as reggae and pop. His musical inspiration varies from reagge musicians such as Bob Marley and Peter Tosh to pop artists as for instance Michael Jackson.

Discography

Extended play 
High Five (2020)

Singles

As lead artist

As featured artist

References 

Year of birth unknown
Living people
People from Korçë
Musicians from London
Albanian musicians
Albanian pop singers
Albanian reggae singers
Albanian-language singers
Albanian songwriters
21st-century Albanian male singers
Albanian emigrants to England
Kënga Magjike winners
Year of birth missing (living people)